Christopher Obi Ogugua  (born September 24, 1970) is an English actor and filmmaker who trained at Drama Centre London and graduated in 2001. He has done a season at the Royal Shakespeare Company where he was directed by Sir Antony Sher in the four-hander, Breakfast with Mugabe and a season at the Globe Theatre in 2007. He is best known for playing Mr. Jacquel/Anubis on American Gods and Klingon captain T’Kuvma in Star Trek: Discovery. Other television roles include Trial & Retribution, Doctor Who, Roots, 3Below: Tales of Arcadia, and Strike Back Revolution.

Early life
Obi was born in London to an Igbo father. He studied at the Drama Centre London and later trained students at Actor in Session, where he serves as Artistic Director.

Career
Obi's professional theater debut was as a Messenger in Edward Hall's production of Macbeth in 2002 in the West End He plays Mr. Jacquel/Anubis in American Gods. Obi played Klingon captain T’Kuvma in Star Trek: Discovery.

Personal life
One of Obi's best friends is actor Charlie Cox.

Filmography

Film

Television

Video games

References

External links
 
 

British male television actors
Living people
Black British male actors
Male actors from London
English people of Igbo descent
English people of Nigerian descent
1967 births